Rowan Software was a British software company focused on the development of computer games. The company was founded by Rod Hyde in 1987 and based in Runcorn, Cheshire.  Rowan was best known as a publisher of flight simulators for the PC.

The company was involved with a number of publishers including Mirrorsoft, Mindscape, Spectrum Holobyte, Virgin, and Empire Interactive. Rowan's involvement with Mirrorsoft included development of the strategy/role-playing title Duster which collapsed when Mirrorsoft was declared bankrupt.

In 1989, Martin Kenwright left with several members of Rowan's staff to form Digital Image Design. Rowan itself was acquired by Empire Interactive in December 2000.

Games
 Air Power: Battle in the Skies
 Dawn Patrol
 Falcon Operation: Firefight
 Falcon Operation: Counterstrike
 Flight of the Intruder
 Flying Corps
 Harrier Combat Simulator
 MiG Alley
 Navy Strike
 Overlord
 Reach for the Skies
 Rowan's Battle of Britain
 Strike Force Harrier

See also
 Fleet Street Publisher

References

External links
 Official website (archived 2000)
 Rowan Software at MobyGames

Video game companies established in 2002
Defunct video game companies of the United Kingdom
2002 establishments in the United Kingdom